List of Libraries in Belize, Central America

National Library Service of Belize
 The San Pedro Public Library
 National Heritage Library, Belmopan City
 Leo Bradley Library
 Port Loyola Public Library
Hopkins Library

University of Belize Librarys
Faculty of Management and Social Sciences, Belize City.
Punta Gorda Library.
Faculty of Agriculture at Central Farm
Main Central Campus Library, Belmopan City.

Belize Law Library of Congress

Supreme Court Law Library 

Baron Bliss Institute, Belize City

Coastal Zone Management Authority and Institute Research/Reference Library 

Belize ELibrary 

Belize Virtual Health Library

Sarteneja Public Library.

References

Belize
 
Libraries
Libraries